Platak is a ski resort located north of Rijeka, Croatia.

References

External links

Ski areas and resorts in Croatia
Rijeka